Cast of Criminals is the 97th novel in the Hardy Boys Mystery Stories and was written by Franklin W. Dixon.  It was published in 1989 by Minstrel Books.

Plot 
The locales are in and around Bayport, New York and New York City. Frank and Joe are called upon to assist the Bayport Players in a production revival of a famous play, Homecoming Nightmare. The lead actress is Frank's girlfriend Callie Shaw. But the production is seriously threatened when someone in the cast decides they want Callie's part; and will do anything to get it.

A tiara that Callie purchases for the play is missing. She has received threats and pleads with Frank and Joe to stop the culprit before opening night. The Boys take on the case unaware that the troublemaker is amongst them.

The Hardy Boys books
1989 American novels
1989 children's books
Novels set in New York (state)
Islip (town), New York